August Anthony Alsina Jr. (born September 3, 1992) is an American singer from New Orleans, Louisiana, formerly signed to Def Jam Recordings. 

Alsina released his first mixtape The Product in 2012, followed by The Product 2 and his debut extended play (EP) Downtown: Life Under the Gun in 2013, the latter released under The-Dream's Radio Killa Records and Def Jam Recordings.

Early life
Alsina was born on September 3, 1992 in New Orleans, Louisiana. He attended middle school in New Orleans. Although no one in his family was musically inclined, he was inspired to sing by Lauryn Hill in Sister Act 2. Alsina first uploaded videos to YouTube in 2007 at age 14, starting with a cover of "Hypothetically" by Lyfe Jennings.

With both his father and stepfather battling crack cocaine addiction, Alsina's mother moved him to Houston, Texas in search of a fresh start after Hurricane Katrina in 2005. Then, Alsina's father died. Alsina had disagreements with his mother at some point and was "kicked out." After his older brother, Melvin La'Branch III, was shot and killed on August 31, 2010, he became more committed to his music, and relocated to Atlanta in 2011.

Career

2012–2014: Downtown: Life Under The Gun and Testimony
His first mixtape The Product was released in April 2012, though an "Untitled" mixtape with six acoustic covers premiered in October 2011. His single "I Luv This Shit" featuring Trinidad James was released in January 2013, and his mixtape The Product 2 followed in May 2013.

The EP Downtown: Life Under the Gun was released on August 20, 2013, with a video for "Hell on Earth" released the following month. On December 9, 2013, the third single from his EP Downtown: Life Under the Gun, "Ghetto" featuring Rich Homie Quan, was serviced to urban contemporary radio and it was the most added song on urban radio the week ending December 12, 2013. On January 14, 2014, Alsina released "Make It Home" featuring Jeezy, as the lead single from his debut studio album. Along with the release, it was revealed that the album would be titled Testimony, which was released on April 15, 2014. He was named part of the 2014 XXL freshmen class.

2015–2016: This Thing Called Life
On December 11, 2015, Alsina released his second studio album, This Thing Called Life. It debuted at number 14 on the Billboard 200, with first-week sales of 41,000 copies in the United States. The album was supported by five singles; "Hip Hop", "Why I Do It" (featuring Lil Wayne), "Song Cry", "Been Around the World" (featuring Chris Brown) and "Dreamer".

2017–present: The Product III: stateofEMERGEncy
Alsina had been working on his third studio  album since 2017. On January 6, 2017, Alsina released the singles "Drugs". Then on June 1, 2017, "Lonely", and on June 6, 2017, "Don't Matter" was released for the album. The album, The Product III: State of Emergency was eventually released on June 26, 2020. The singer announced that the album highlights "the struggle in my life, my upbringing as a crack baby, losing my father and sister, and becoming the guardian for my three nieces", as well as his battle with the auto-immune disease that affected him.

On September 21, 2021, he announced that he was “likely” retiring from music.

Artistry
Alsina's music generally falls into the R&B category, often fusing it with hip-hop. His musical influences are Chris Brown, Usher and Lyfe Jennings.

Personal life

Health condition
In 2017, the singer revealed that he suffers from a severe autoimmune disease that attacks his liver. This illness has led to multiple incidents including a collapse on stage in 2014.

On July 8, 2019, Alsina updated his health scare. In a video he posted to Instagram, the singer explained that he was hospitalized after suffering a loss of mobility. "We're doing a bunch of tests and they're saying I have some nerve damage going on throughout my body".

Jada Pinkett Smith relationship
On June 30, 2020, Alsina claimed he was granted permission from Will Smith to be in a romantic relationship with his wife Jada Pinkett Smith. The following day, a representative for Pinkett Smith released a statement concerning the claims, referring to them as "absolutely not true." However, on July 10, in an episode of her talk show Red Table Talk, alongside Will Smith, Jada revealed that she did have a romantic relationship with Alsina four and a half years prior, when she and Will were separated. She stated she "got into a different kind of entanglement with August." Jada and Will denied that Will gave Alsina permission for the relationship, with Jada saying Alsina "would perceive it as permission because we [her and Will] were separated amicably". Pinkett Smith further claimed she wanted to "heal" Alsina, but needed to find healing for herself first. She and Will eventually reconciled after she broke things off with Alsina; she says she has not spoken with Alsina since.

After Jada's use of the word "entanglement" went viral on the Internet, Alsina released a collaboration titled "Entanglements" with rapper Rick Ross on July 19, 2020, in which Alsina sings  "You left your man just to fuck with me and break his heart".

Discography

 Testimony (2014)
 This Thing Called Life (2015)
 The Product III: State of Emergency (2020)

Awards and nominations

BET Awards

|-
|rowspan=4|2014
|rowspan=2|August Alsina
|Best Male R&B/Pop Artist
|
|-
|Best New Artist
|
|-
|rowspan=2|"I Luv This Shit"
|Best Collaboration
|
|-
|Coca-Cola Viewers' Choice Award
|
|-
|rowspan=2|2015
|August Alsina
|Best Male R&B/Pop Artist
|
|-
|"No Love" (Remix)
|Best Collaboration
|
|-

Tours

Headlining
 Testimony Live (2014)

Opening act
 The UR Experience Tour (2014)

References

External links
 
 Def Jam – August Alsina

1992 births
Living people
21st-century African-American male singers
African-American male singer-songwriters
American hip hop singers
American contemporary R&B singers
American soul singers
Def Jam Recordings artists
Rhythm and blues musicians from New Orleans
Southern hip hop musicians
Singer-songwriters from Louisiana